Gary William Nowak (born December 8, 1948) is a former American football defensive tackle who played for the San Diego Chargers of the National Football League (NFL). He played college football at Michigan State University.

References 

1948 births
Living people
People from St. Clair Shores, Michigan
Sportspeople from Metro Detroit
Players of American football from Michigan
American football defensive tackles
Michigan State Spartans football players
San Diego Chargers players